In music theory,  (Latin: 'somewhat hard leap') describes a dissonant leap that is used for rhetorical effect. The term was coined by Christoph Bernhard in his Tractatus compositionis augmentatus.

See also
Passus duriusculus

References

Musical techniques
Melody